Afghanistan National Television (  Telvizoon-e Milli Afganistan,  Da Afganistan Milli Telvizoon) is the state-owned television channel in Afghanistan. It is part of the Radio Television Afghanistan (RTA) public broadcaster.

History
Afghan television was launched on 19 August 1978, Afghan Independence Day, in a ceremony headed by Nur Muhammad Taraki. Since the beginning its broadcasts were in colour.

In 1983 three new stations were commissioned in Kandahar, Jalalabad and Herat, however they started its broadcasts some months later. On 2 January 1985 the broadcasts started in Jalalabad while a new station in Badakhshan Province finished its construction. On 3 February 1985 a new station opened in Ghazni, while the same month the broadcasts started in Kandahar and Herat.

During the Taliban regime, Afghanistan National Television ceased operations when television was banned, and on 8 July 1998 they ordered the destruction of all TV sets. After the Taliban were overthrown, television in Afghanistan restarted on 18 November 2001.

In 2019, RTA launched a sister channel to the main station called RTA Sport, which is dedicated to sports content.

Exclusive 2008 speech

RTA became famous worldwide when Afghan President Hamid Karzai made a live speech to the world minutes after dozens of insurgents attempted to assassinate him at an Afghan military parade. The assassination attempt was thwarted by the Afghan National Army. The scene of the attempt was also broadcast live to RTA viewers in Afghanistan and picked up by the international media.

International availability
Afghanistan National Television became available in Europe, Middle East, North Africa Africa Asia Pacific and North America on 5 January 2008. The channel's broadcasting hours were 06:00 to 00:00 (local Afghan time), corresponding to 01:30 to 19:30 UTC; later that year it started broadcasting 24 hours. As of 2018, it is no longer broadcast on the Hot Bird satellite in Europe.

Currently the channel broadcasts on the TürkmenÄlem 52°E / MonacoSAT satellite to viewers in and around Afghanistan and in Europe, and western Asia. It also broadcasts on GSAT-19 for viewers in the Indian subcontinent.

See also
 Television in Afghanistan

References

Publicly funded broadcasters
Television channels and stations established in 1964
State media
Soviet foreign aid